Year 454 (CDLIV) was a common year starting on Friday (link will display the full calendar) of the Julian calendar. At the time, it was known as the Year of the Consulship of Aetius and Studius (or, less frequently, year 1207 Ab urbe condita). The denomination 454 for this year has been used since the early medieval period, when the Anno Domini calendar era became the prevalent method in Europe for naming years.

Events 
 By place 
 Roman Empire 
 September 21 – Emperor Valentinian III stabs his commander-in-chief Flavius Aetius to death, during a meeting of the imperial council at Ravenna. He has accused Aetius of plotting against him to seize power. After his assassination, the Western Roman Empire has no effective defender against its hostile barbarian neighbors (Alans, Franks, Ostrogoths, Vandals and Visigoths).

 Europe 
 Battle of Nedao: Allied forces of subjected peoples (Gepids, Heruli, Ostrogoths, Rugii, Sciri and Suebi), under the leadership of King Ardaric, defeat the Huns under Ellac, eldest son of Attila the Hun, in Pannonia. Ellac is killed during the battle and succeeded by his brother Dengizich.
 Ardaric unites the Gepids with other Germanic tribes, and founds the Kingdom of the Gepids in the Pannonian Basin.  
 The Vandals conquer Malta. 
 Ireland: The Diocese of Clogher is erected.

Births 
 Theodoric the Great, king of the Ostrogoths (d. 526)
 Xian Wen Di, Chinese emperor of Northern Wei (d. 476)

Deaths  
 September 21 – Flavius Aetius, Roman general (magister militum)
 Ellac, king of the Huns
 Justa Grata Honoria, sister of Valentinian III (approximate date)
 Dioscorus the Great, patriarch of Alexandria

References